Ian Edward Fraser,  (18 December 1920 – 1 September 2008) was an English diving pioneer, sailor and recipient of the Victoria Cross, the highest award for gallantry in the face of the enemy that can be awarded to British and Commonwealth forces. Fraser was born in Ealing in Middlesex and went to school in High Wycombe. After initially working on merchant ships and serving in the Royal Naval Reserve, he joined the Royal Navy at the start of the Second World War. After being awarded the Distinguished Service Cross for actions while serving on submarines, he was placed in command of a midget submarine during an attack in Singapore codenamed Operation Struggle. For his bravery in navigating the mined waters, and successfully placing mines on a Japanese cruiser, Fraser was awarded the Victoria Cross.

After retiring from the Royal Navy, Fraser set up a commercial diving organisation after realising the ease of use of new frogman-type diving equipment. After serving in several honorary positions on the Wirral, Fraser retired from the Royal Naval Reserve as a lieutenant commander in 1965. He died on 1 September 2008, on the Wirral, Merseyside.

Early life
Fraser was born in Ealing in 1920. He was the elder son of Sydney Fraser, a marine engineer. He attended the Royal Grammar School, High Wycombe, and the school ship . He worked on merchant ships from 1938 to 1939.

Second World War
Fraser joined the Royal Naval Reserve in 1939, initially with the rank of midshipman, serving on several destroyers. In 1943, he joined the submarine . He was awarded the Distinguished Service Cross in 1943 for "bravery and skill in successful submarine patrols." In 1944, at age 24, he became a lieutenant in the Royal Naval Reserve, and volunteered to serve on the 'X' craft midget submarine depot ship  from 7 November 1944 to July 1945.

Ian Fraser was played by actor Martin Delaney in a TV show entitled, Victoria Cross Heroes. The show was narrated in part by Charles, Prince of Wales. It tells the story of Fraser's attempt to sink the Takao on a secret mission aboard a midget submarine.

On 31 July 1945 in the Straits of Johor between Singapore and Malaya, Lieutenant Fraser, in command of an improved X-boat, HMS XE-3, attacked the Japanese heavy cruiser Takao, after making a long and hazardous journey through mined waters. Fraser slid the submarine under the Takao, which lay over a depression in the sea bed, and his diver Acting Leading Seaman James Joseph Magennis went out to fix the limpet mines to the bottom of the ship. The two side-charges then had to be released from XE-3, but the starboard charge stuck and Magennis climbed out again and after a nerve-wracking seven minutes released the charge. XE-3 then made for home. Magennis was also awarded a Victoria Cross, and Fraser became a lieutenant-commander.

The citation was published in a supplement to the London Gazette of 9 November 1945 (dated 13 November 1945) and read:

His VC is on display in the Lord Ashcroft Gallery at the Imperial War Museum, London.

Later life
 1946: Fraser was awarded the American decoration of Legion of Merit, Degree of Officer.
 1947: Fraser left the Royal Navy, but he remained in the Royal Naval Reserve. He set up a commercial diving firm.
 1953: He was promoted to lieutenant-commander.
 1957: Fraser's autobiography Frogman VC was published.
 1957: He became a Justice of the Peace in Wallasey.
 16 August 1963: He was awarded a clasp to his Decoration for Officers of the Royal Naval Reserve.
 18 December 1965: He left the Royal Naval Reserve.
 1980: He became a Younger Brother of Trinity House.
 1993: He was made an honorary freeman of the Metropolitan Borough of Wirral.
 1 September 2008: Fraser died aged 87 at Arrowe Park Hospital, after a three-week illness. He was survived by his wife Melba, and 5 of his 6 children, and 13 grandchildren, and 7 great-grandchildren. He was cremated at Landican cemetery, Birkenhead.

Scuba diving
Realising that frogman-type diving (i.e. what is now called scuba diving) could do many sorts of underwater work that the old-type heavy standard diving gear was unsuitable for, he and some associates got hold of war-surplus frogman's kit and set up a popular public show displaying frogman techniques in a big aquarium tank in Belle Vue Zoo in Manchester in England. One of his early calls to underwater work was from the police to recover the body of a little girl who had drowned in a pond in Denton, Greater Manchester.

Using the show's takings, and with his younger brother Brian Fraser, he set up a commercial diving organisation called Universal Divers Ltd, of which he was managing director  from 1947 to 1965 and, since 1983 (as former chairman).

In January 1961 Universal Divers Ltd was involved in underwater survey on damage caused to the Severn Railway Bridge by collision by two barges.

See also
British commando frogmen

References

External links
 Daily Telegraph obituary
 The Times obituary
 Magennis and Ian Fraser
 Imperial War Museum Interview

British World War II recipients of the Victoria Cross
1920 births
2008 deaths
People from Ealing
People educated at the Royal Grammar School, High Wycombe
English underwater divers
Royal Navy officers of World War II
Royal Naval Volunteer Reserve personnel of World War II
Royal Navy submarine commanders
Officers of the Legion of Merit
Frogman operations
Royal Navy recipients of the Victoria Cross
Recipients of the Distinguished Service Cross (United Kingdom)
People educated aboard HMS Conway
Professional divers
Royal Naval Reserve personnel
Members of Trinity House